Samuel Hitt Elbert (April 3, 1833 – November 27, 1899) was an attorney in the Nebraska Territory before settling in the Colorado Territory. He served as the Secretary of the territory and from 1873 to 1874, he was the Governor of the Colorado Territory. He was a justice of the Colorado Supreme Court from 1876 to 1888 and was chief justice from 1879 to 1882.

He was married to Josephine Evans, the daughter of Territorial Governor John Evans. She died of tuberculosis following the birth and death of her only child; the Evans Memorial Chapel was built by her father in her memory.

Early life and education
Samuel Hitt Elbert was born in Logan County, Ohio. His parents were Achsa Hitt, the daughter of Rev. Samuel Hitt, and John Downs Elbert, a physician and surgeon. He descends from early colonists and Huguenots. His great-grandfather, Dr. John Lodman Elbert, was a surgeon during the American Revolution.

He moved with his family to the Iowa Territory in 1840. He attended public school, where the curriculum included agriculture. He studied at Ohio Wesleyan University where he was a member of Beta Theta Pi. He graduated in 1854 and continued to study law at a leading law firm in Dayton, Ohio for two years. He was then admitted to the bar in Ohio in 1856. He moved to Plattsmouth in the Nebraska Territory in the spring of 1857 to practice law.

Career
In Nebraska, Elbert became active in the newly formed Republican Party. He attended the Republican National Convention in 1860 in Chicago, where Abraham Lincoln was nominated for president. He became acquainted with John Evans and Lincoln at the convention. He later also attended the 1864 National Union National Convention where Lincoln was renominated.

He left Nebraska for Colorado in 1862. Elbert was appointed Secretary of the Colorado Territory that year by Abraham Lincoln. He occasionally stood in for Governor Evans when needed. He served from 1862 until 1867 under Governors John Evans and Alexander Cummings. He dealt with hostilities between settlers and Native Americans. During the Civil War, he helped form and then mobilized the 2nd and 3rd Colorado regiments for the war effort. He helped organize the Republican Party in the Colorado Territory.

He formed the law firm Charles & Elbert with J. Q. Charles. He was elected to the territorial legislature in 1869. He was made secretary one year later. He became the chairman of the Republican central committee for Colorado in 1872.

Elbert was appointed as the sixth Governor of the Colorado Territory by President Ulysses S. Grant in 1873. President Grant became the first U.S. President to visit Colorado that summer. The President stayed at Governor Elbert's home. Elbert and Grant visited Central City, and met with a group of Ute leaders to create a treaty (Brunot Treaty of 1873) that would allow some of the Ute's land to be accessible to railroad and mining companies. As governor, he promoted irrigation methods and founded the Western Irrigation Conference, which wrote water laws to ensure viable agriculture industries in Colorado. Governor Elbert served until his predecessor, Edward M. McCook, was reappointed Governor in the spring of 1874, but was not confirmed by Congress until July.

Elbert spent a year in Europe, during which he became aware of the political and social conditions there. Colorado became a state in 1876. Elbert was elected to the Colorado Supreme Court in 1876 and served until 1888. During that time, he served as the chief justice of the Supreme Court from 1879 to 1883. He resigned in 1888 due to his poor health, and went abroad.

He received an honorary LLD from Ohio Wesleyan University in 1880.

Personal life

After a two-year courtship, Elbert married 18 year old Josephine Evans in June 1865. She was the daughter of Territorial Governor John Evans and Hannah Pedrick Canby. They were married by Bishop Matthew Simpson. George Armstrong Custer was the best man.

The Elberts lived in a red brick house on E Street, now 14th Street. Josephine gave birth to their only child, John Evans Elbert about late March 1868. He died on August 10, 1868. Josephine, who had consumption (tuberculosis), died on October 1868. Her father built the Evans Memorial Chapel in her memory in 1878. It is located at the University of Denver campus.

After having been in failing health for some time, Elbert died on November 27, 1899 in Galveston, Texas and is buried at Riverside Cemetery in Denver, as are Josephine and their son John.

Legacy
Elbert County, Colorado; Elbert, Colorado; and Mount Elbert, the highest peak in the Rocky Mountains, are named in honor of Elbert.

See also

History of Colorado
Law and Government of Colorado

Notes

References

Further reading

External links
Official biography of Samuel Hitt Elbert
Justice Samuel Hitt Elbert

1833 births
1899 deaths
Colorado Mining Boom
Justices of the Colorado Supreme Court
Governors of Colorado Territory
People from Logan County, Ohio
Nebraska Republicans
Colorado Republicans
Chief Justices of the Colorado Supreme Court
19th-century American judges